Ronald Forrest Cash (November 20, 1949 – April 22, 2009) was an American utility player in Major League Baseball who played from  through  for the Detroit Tigers. He was born in Atlanta, Georgia.

Cash attended Manatee Community College and Florida State University, appearing in the 1968 Junior College World Series and 1970 College World Series. He was drafted five times and never signed, being selected by the Los Angeles Dodgers (1967), Baltimore Orioles (1968), Atlanta Braves (1968), San Diego Padres (1969) and Minnesota Twins (1969).

Finally, Cash signed with Detroit in 1971 and debuted with the Tigers on September 4, 1973, hitting a .410 batting average (16-for-39) in 14 games. He divided his playing time between left field and third base, while in 1974 he appeared mostly at first base and third.

Cash also played for Triple-A Toledo Mud Hens in 1973 and for the Cangrejeros de Santurce of the Puerto Rico Baseball League in the 1973–1974 season under manager Frank Robinson.

In a two-season majors career, Cash was a .297 hitter (30-for-101) in 34 games, including 14 runs, 11 runs batted in, three doubles, one triple, and a .324 on-base percentage. He made 32 appearances, at first base (15), third base (10) and left field (7).

Cash died in Tampa, Florida, at the age of 59. He was the uncle of Tampa Bay Rays manager, Kevin Cash.

References

External links

Ron Cash at Baseball Almanac

Detroit Tigers players
Toledo Mud Hens players
Major League Baseball infielders
Major League Baseball outfielders
Baseball players from Georgia (U.S. state)
1949 births
2009 deaths
Florida State Seminoles baseball players
SCF Manatees baseball players
Batavia Trojans players
Montgomery Rebels players
Rocky Mount Leafs players
Evansville Triplets players
State College of Florida, Manatee–Sarasota alumni